Leesburg Depot is a historic train depot in Leesburg, Georgia. It was on the old Central of Georgia Railway. It was damaged in a 2006 storm. It was added to the National Register of Historic Places on May 12, 2008. It is located at 106 Walnut Avenue North. In 2013, studies were being carried out regarding a possible restoration.

See also
National Register of Historic Places listings in Lee County, Georgia

References

Railway stations on the National Register of Historic Places in Georgia (U.S. state)
Railway stations in the United States opened in 1895
Former Central of Georgia Railway stations
National Register of Historic Places in Lee County, Georgia
Former railway stations in Georgia (U.S. state)